Adam Brett Walker (born April 9, 1963) is an American football coach and former player.  He played professional as a running back in the National Football League (NFL) with the Minnesota Vikings during the 1987 NFL season.

Walker has been serving on the coaching staff of the football team at Concordia University Wisconsin since 2006. He was also head coach of the track & field team from 2006 to 2010.

Personal
His son, Adam Brett Walker II, is a professional baseball player.

References

External links
 Concordia profile

1963 births
Living people
American football quarterbacks
American football running backs
Carthage Firebirds football players
Concordia Falcons football coaches
Minnesota Vikings players
College track and field coaches in the United States
Players of American football from New York City
National Football League replacement players